Singnuea Chiang Mai Physical Education Football Club (Thai สโมสรฟุตบอลสิงห์เหนือ พลศึกษา เชียงใหม่), is a Thai football club based in, Chiang Mai Thailand. The club is currently playing in the 2017 Thailand Amateur League Northern Region.

Record

References

 http://video.genfb.com/703482239852897
 http://www.chiangmainews.co.th/page/archives/tag/%E0%B8%AA%E0%B8%B4%E0%B8%87%E0%B8%AB%E0%B9%8C%E0%B9%80%E0%B8%AB%E0%B8%99%E0%B8%B7%E0%B8%AD

Association football clubs established in 2016
Football clubs in Thailand
Sport in Tak province
2016 establishments in Thailand
University and college association football clubs